Eddis is an English surname. Notable people with this surname include:

 Basil Eddis (1881–1971), Anglo-Indian businessman
 Bruce Eddis (1883–1966), English cricket player
 Eden Upton Eddis (1812–1901), British portrait artist
 Edward Wilton Eddis (1825–1905), English poet